Van A. Harvey was George Edwin Burnell Professor of Religious Studies (Emeritus) at Stanford University.  Born in Hankow, China, he served in the U.S. Navy (1943–46), and was awarded a BA in Philosophy from  Occidental College (1948, Phi Beta Kappa). After attending Princeton Theological Seminary for one year, he  received a B.D. from Yale Divinity School in 1951 and a PhD. from Yale University in 1957 in post-Enlightenment  religious thought. His thesis was entitled "Myth, Faith, and History" and his thesis supervisor was H. Richard Niebuhr.

Van Harvey taught at Princeton University (1954–58), Perkins School of Theology at Southern Methodist  University (1958–68), the University of Pennsylvania (1968–78), and Stanford University (1978–1996). He was  Chair of the graduate program in religion at SMU and Chair of his departments at both the University of  Pennsylvania and Stanford.

The aim of his first book A Handbook of Theological Terms (1964) was to explain to laypersons the meaning of technical terms found in Christian theology, with special attention to issues dividing Protestant  and Catholic theology. His second book The Historian and the  Believer (1966) was  concerned with the way in which "morality of knowledge" that informs professional historical inquiry poses problems for the believer and theologian who attempt to justify the historical claims of Christianity “on faith”, especially when historical inquiry is concerned with Jesus of Nazareth. Harvey argues that these problems have not been satisfactorily dealt with by modern Christian theologians. He pays particular attention to the theologies of Karl Barth, Paul Tillich, and Rudolf Bultmann. New Testament scholar Gerd Lüdemann states in a citation of this book that "I have long been more indebted to this than is evident from the number of explicit references" The third edition of 1996 contains a new introduction outlining his mature position on these issues.

One commentator has characterized Harvey's career after 1980 as having been transformed from theologian into skeptical student of religion. This change is reflected in both his articles and preeminently in his  third book Feuerbach and the Interpretation of Religion (1995), winner of the 1996 American Academy of  Religion’s award for excellence in constructive-reflective studies. This book argues that the neglected later writings of Ludwig Feuerbach dropped much of the Hegelian elements informing his better-known early work and created a  more powerful theory for the origins and persistence of religion. Harvey compares this theory with several well-known contemporary social-scientific and psychological theories and judges Feuerbach's to be superior.

Harvey was awarded an honorary degree in the Humanities from Occidental College, two John Simon Guggenheim Fellowships (1966 and 1972), a National Endowment of the Humanities Fellowship (1979), a Visiting  Fellowship from Clare Hall, Cambridge University (1979), and distinguished teaching awards from both the  University of Pennsylvania and Stanford University. He contributed to several encyclopedias and reference works including the online Stanford Encyclopedia of Philosophy. Harvey died July 11, 2021.

Select Bibliography 
 “On Believing What is Difficult to Understand,” Jr. of Rel. 39 (1959), 219-31.
 “D. F. Strauss’ Life of Jesus Revisited,” Church History. 30 (1961), 191-211.
 “Wie Neu ist die ‘Neue Frage nach dem historischen Jesus’?” (with S. M. Ogden), Zeit. f. Theol. u. Kirche, 59 (1962): 46-87 (“How New is the ‘New Quest . . .’ (With S. M. Ogden), The Historical Jesus and the Kergymatic Christ, eds., C.E. Braaten & R. A. Harrisville, (New York, 1964: 197-242).
 “A Handbook of Theological Terms (New York: 1964).
 “The Historical Jesus, the Kerygma, and the Christian Faith,” Rel. in Life 43 (1964) 430-50.
 “The Historian and the Believer” (New York: 1969; Philadelphia: 1981; Urbana, Ill.: 1996 [with a new introduction]).
 “Is There an Ethics of Belief?” Jr. of Rel. 49 (1969), 41-58.
 “A Christology for Barabbases,” Perkins School of Theo. Jour., 29 (1976) 1-13.
 “The Ethics of Belief Reconsidered,” Jr. of Rel., 59 (1979), 406-20.
 “The Dilemma of the Unbelieving Theologian,” Amer. Jr. of Theo. & Phil. 2 (1981), 46-54.
 “Nietzsche and the Kantian Paradigm of Religious Faith” in Witness and Existence, eds., P. E. Devenish & L. Goodwin (Chicago: 1989), 140-161.
 “Feuerbach and the Interpretation of Religion” (Cambridge, Eng.: 1995).
 “Feuerbach on Luther’s Doctrine of Revelation,” Jr. of Rel.'', 78 (1997), 3-17.

References

External links 
 Van Harvey's article on Ludwig Feuerbach for Stanford Encyclopedia of Philosophy (This article is archived. The current article on Feuerbach is a different one.)
 Van Harvey's book review of Wittgensteinian Fideism? by Kai Nielsen and D. Z. Phillips (requires payment to view past first page)
 Article "Secularism: Will it Survive?" Published by Council for Secular Humanism
 2007 Speech given at conference “Scripture and Skepticism” at UC Davis
 John Simon Guggenheim bio of Van Harvey
  Guide to Collection of Van Harvey papers at Stanford University Libraries
 Van Austin Harvey Papers
  Stanford audio interview with Van Harvey about his life and work
 Stanford University Obituary for Van A. Harvey

1926 births
2021 deaths
People from Wuhan
American Christian theologians
Stanford University Department of Religious Studies faculty
20th-century American theologians
American religion academics
American expatriates in China